Stankevičius is a Lithuanian-language surname, the Lithuanized version of Polish  surname Stankiewicz. Notable people with this surname include: 

 Marius Stankevičius (born 1981), professional footballer
 Rimantas Stankevičius (1944–1990), test pilot and cosmonaut
 Laurynas Stankevičius (1935–2017), Prime Minister of Lithuania
 Česlovas Stankevičius (born 1937), politician
 Simonas Stankevičius (born 1995), professional footballer

See also
Staškevičius

Lithuanian-language surnames